Odostomia socorroensis is a species of sea snail, a marine gastropod mollusk in the family Pyramidellidae, the pyrams and their allies.

According to ITIS, this species is a synonym of Odostomia tenuisculpta Carpenter, 1864

Description
The light yellow shell has an ovate shape. The length measures 4.6 mm. The whorls of the protoconch are deeply obliquely immersed in the first of the succeeding turns, above which only the tilted edge of the last volution projects. The six whorls of the teleoconch are well
rounded, moderately contracted at the sutures, appressed at the summit. The sutures are strongly impressed. The periphery of the body whorl is feebly angulated. The base of the shell is rather long and slightly rounded. The entire surface of the spire and the base are marked by very numerous, closely crowded, exceedingly fine spiral striations. The aperture is ovate. The posterior angle is with a decided notch. The thin outer lip is strongly arcuate. The columella is slender, curved, and slightly revolute. It is provided with a fold at its insertion.

Distribution
The type specimen was found in the Pacific Ocean off Socorro Island, Mexico.

References

External links
 To USNM Invertebrate Zoology Mollusca Collection
 To World Register of Marine Species
 To ITIS

socorroensis
Gastropods described in 1909